20 años is the seventh studio album recorded by Mexican singer Luis Miguel, It was released by WEA Latina on May 18, 1990. The album was produced by Spanish singer-songwriter, composer and record producer Juan Carlos Calderón, who had worked on the two previous albums by Luis Miguel, and was a massive success across Latin-America, Spain, and with Hispanic listeners in the United States. Almost all the tracks of the album were played on the radio, but the songs officially issued as singles are "Tengo Todo Excepto A Tí", "Entrégate", "Amante del Amor", "Hoy el aire huele a ti", "Más allá de todo" and "Será que no me amas".
 
In 1991, the album received a nomination for a Grammy Award for Best Latin Pop Album in the 33rd Annual Grammy Awards and for Lo Nuestro Award for Pop Album of the Year at the 3rd Lo Nuestro Awards.

This album was the album that confirmed the success that Luis Miguel had reached with his last album Busca una mujer. The album broke the record in Mexico of most copies sold in one weekend (600,000 copies during the release weekend).

"Será que no me amas" had an "official choreography" that remains popular in Latin America to date. The album's second song, Oro de ley has become known among fans of professional wrestling for being the entrance theme of Japanese joshi wrestler Akira Hokuto.

Promotion

To promote the album, Luis Miguel began his 20 Años Tour on 12 July 1990 in Mexico City. On this tour he performed several shows at Mexico's Centro de Espectáculos Premier, these concerts were recorded and later released as a VHS video called Luis Miguel: 20 Años.

Track listing

Personnel 
Adapted from the 20 Años liner notes:

Performance credits

John Robinson – drums, percussion
Dennis Belfield – bass
Neil Stubenhaus – bass
Paul Jackson Jr. – electric guitar
Oscar Castro-Neves – acoustic guitar
Robbie Buchanan – piano, synthesizers
Juan Carlos Calderón – piano, synthesizers
Gina Kronstadt String Section – strings
Jerry Hey Brass Section – brass
Herb Alpert – trumpet solo 
Dan Higgins – saxophone solo
Martika – chorus
Darlene Koldenhoven – chorus
Marlene Landin – chorus
K. C. Porter – chorus
Jose Pezullo – chorus
Dan Navarro – chorus
Clydene Jackson – chorus

Technical credits

Juan Carlos Calderón – producer, arrangements
Robbie Buchanan – arrangements
Jerry Hey – brass arrangements
Philip Cacayorin – computer programming
Ivy Skoff – general coordination 
Carlos Somonte – photography 
José Quintana – production coordination
Bernie Grundman – mastering
Benny Faccone – recording engineer, mixer engineer
Mike Kloster – recording assistant
Brad Gilderman – mixer

Charts

Weekly charts

Year-end charts

Certifications and sales

See also 
 List of best-selling albums in Argentina
 List of best-selling albums in Mexico
 List of best-selling Latin albums

References 

1990 albums
Luis Miguel albums
Warner Music Latina albums
Spanish-language albums
Albums produced by Juan Carlos Calderón